Euler circle may refer to:

 Nine-point circle, a circle that can be constructed for any given triangle
 Euler diagram, a diagrammatic means of representing propositions and their relationships
 Venn diagram, a diagram type originally also called Euler circle